Gastón de Moncada y Gralla-Despla, 2nd Marquis of Aitona (1554–1626) was a member of Spanish nobility who was the Viceroy of Sardinia (1590–1595) and the Viceroy of Aragon (1604-1610).

He was one of the 17 children of the 2nd Count of Aitona Francisco de Moncada y Folch de Cardona, 1st Marquis of Aitona. His grandfather was Juan de Moncada y de Tolça, 11th Baronet.

He married Catalina de Moncada y Bou, baronesa de Callosa, and had several children, including :
 Francisco de Moncada, 3rd Marquis of Aitona, (1586–1635) interim Governor of the Spanish Netherlands.
 Pedro, Bishop of Gerona.

Further reading
http://www.newadvent.org/cathen/10476a.htm

1626 deaths
Viceroys of Aragon
Viceroys of Sardinia
Gaston 02
1554 births